Dolinsk is a town and the administrative center of Dolinsky District of Sakhalin Oblast, Russia, located in the southeast of the Sakhalin Island in the valley of the Naiba River and its tributaries, about  north of Yuzhno-Sakhalinsk and  from the coast of the Terpeniye Bay of the Sea of Okhotsk. Population:

History
The present site of the town was the location of the Ainu settlement Ziancha until 1884, when the Russian village of Galkino-Vraskoye (named after Mikhail Galkin-Vraskoy) was founded. The Treaty of Portsmouth saw it transferred to Japanese control in 1905, along with the rest of southern Sakhalin. It was given machi (town) status by the Japanese, under the name .

The Red Army retook control of the whole of Sakhalin in 1945, during the closing stages of World War II. In 1946, the town received its present name, roughly translating as town in the valley.

Since the 1940s, the town's population has decreased by more than half, from a high of 25,135 in 1941 down to 12,200 inhabitants recorded in the 2010 Census.

Administrative and municipal status
Within the framework of administrative divisions, Dolinsk serves as the administrative center of Dolinsky District and is subordinated to it. As a municipal division, the town of Dolinsk and twelve rural localities of Dolinsky District are incorporated as Dolinsky Urban Okrug.

Economy
Paper and machinery are produced in the town, with fishing and coal mining conducted in the surrounding area.

Transportation
The main north-south Sakhalin railway connecting Yuzhno-Sakhalinsk with Nogliki passes through the town.

Military
The Dolinsk-Sokol air force base is located to the south of the town.

Climate
Like the rest of southern Sakhalin, Dolinsk has a cold humid continental climate (Köppen Dfb) with cold and snowy winters and mild, rainy summers. Lying exposed to moist southeasterly flows from the Pacific Ocean, it is substantially wetter than either Yuzhno-Sakhalinsk or Alexandrovsk-Sakhalinsky, and receives very heavy snow in winter.

Sister city
 Nayoro, Japan

References

Notes

Sources

External links

Official website of Dolinsk 
Dolinsk Business Directory 

Cities and towns in Sakhalin Oblast